Jönköping and Kronoberg County, or Jönköpings och Kronobergs län was a county of the Swedish Empire in several periods from 1634 to 1687. It was ultimately split into the Jönköping County and the Kronoberg County.

Former counties of Sweden
1634 establishments in Sweden